Ágúst Gylfason (born 1 August 1971) is an Icelandic football manager and a former player. He was manager of Breiðablik until 2019, when he became manager of Grótta's men's football team.

Club career
Ágúst started his career at Valur before moving to SK Brann in Norway. He returned to Iceland after three years to play for Fram.  He had a trial with Tranmere Rovers in 1998.

International career
Ágúst made his debut for Iceland in an April 1993 friendly match against the USA, coming on as a late substitute for Arnar Grétarsson. He earned his 6th and last cap in a November 1996 World Cup qualifier against Ireland.

References

External links
 
 

1971 births
Living people
Agust Thor Gylfason
Agust Thor Gylfason
Agust Thor Gylfason
Agust Thor Gylfason
SK Brann players
Agust Thor Gylfason
Agust Thor Gylfason
Agust Thor Gylfason
Expatriate footballers in Norway
Agust Thor Gylfason
Agust Thor Gylfason
Agust Thor Gylfason
Eliteserien players
Úrvalsdeild karla (football) managers
Association football midfielders
Icelandic football managers